The following is an incomplete list of hoverfly species within the genus Toxomerus:

References 

Toxomerus
Syrphinae